Somatidia spectabilis is a species of beetle in the family Cerambycidae. It was described by Broun in 1917.

References

spectabilis
Beetles described in 1917